Mark L. Macon (born April 14, 1969)  is an American basketball coach and former professional player. He is the former head coach of Binghamton University and a current staff member at his alma mater, Temple University.

Playing career
Macon was named Mr. Basketball of Michigan in 1987 following his prep career at Saginaw Buena Vista High School.

A 6'4" (1.93 m), 185 lb (84 kg) guard, Macon played collegiately at Temple University, alongside future NBA players Aaron McKie and Eddie Jones, and was selected by the Denver Nuggets in the first round (eighth overall) of the 1991 NBA draft.

Macon played for the Nuggets and the Detroit Pistons in six NBA seasons, averaging 6.7 ppg in his career (and missing the entire schedule from 1996 to 1998). Macon also briefly represented the CBA's Florida Beachdogs and Italian club Mabo Pistoia, while still contracted to the Pistons, and Oyak Bursa Spor Kulubu (Turkey), the Atlantic City Seagulls (USBL) and Venezuela's Toros de Aragua, from 1999 to 2001.

Coaching career
Macon began coaching at his alma mater, Temple, as an assistant from 2003 to 2006. He then moved on to Georgia State University for the 2006–07 season before being hired by Binghamton University as an assistant coach in 2007.

On October 14, 2009, Macon was named Binghamton's interim head coach, replacing Kevin Broadus, who was placed on administrative leave in the wake of the Binghamton University basketball scandal. Two months later, Macon was given a raise from his $57,651 salary to an undisclosed amount.

On April 28, 2010 Binghamton announced that Broadus would not return as head coach and signed Macon to a two-year contract extension to remain interim head basketball coach. Originally, school officials announced that a permanent replacement would not be named until the school hired a new president and athletic director.  However, on February 9, 2011 the university announced that Macon signed a contract extension through the 2013–14 season and that the interim tag was being removed.  On April 13, 2012, Macon was fired with a 23–70 record in three years at Binghamton, including a 2–29 mark (the worst record in school history) for the 2011–12 season.

On April 12, 2019, Macon was announced as the Assistant to the Head Coach under Aaron McKie at his alma mater, Temple.

Head coaching record

See also
 List of NCAA Division I men's basketball players with 11 or more steals in a game

References

External links
NBA stats @ basketball-reference.com
Basketpedya career data

1969 births
Living people
African-American basketball coaches
African-American basketball players
All-American college men's basketball players
American expatriate basketball people in Italy
American expatriate basketball people in Turkey
American expatriate basketball people in Venezuela
American men's basketball players
Basketball coaches from Michigan
Basketball players from Michigan
Binghamton Bearcats men's basketball coaches
College men's basketball head coaches in the United States
Denver Nuggets draft picks
Denver Nuggets players
Detroit Pistons players
Georgia State Panthers men's basketball coaches
McDonald's High School All-Americans
Olimpia Basket Pistoia players
Oyak Renault basketball players
Parade High School All-Americans (boys' basketball)
Shooting guards
Sportspeople from Saginaw, Michigan
Temple Owls men's basketball coaches
Temple Owls men's basketball players
21st-century African-American people
20th-century African-American sportspeople